Blanca Flor Airport  is an airstrip serving the village of Blanca Flor in the Pando Department of Bolivia. The runway parallels the short road from the Beni River to the village.

See also

Transport in Bolivia
List of airports in Bolivia

References

External links 
OpenStreetMap - Blanca Flor
OurAirports - Blanca Flor
Fallingrain - Blanca Flor Airport
HERE/Nokia Maps - Blanca Flor

Airports in Pando Department